Tetiana Luzhanska and Zheng Saisai are the defending champions.

Shuko Aoyama and Chang Kai-chen won the title, defeating Luzhanska and Zheng 6–2, 7–5 in the final.

Seeds

Draw

Draw

References
 Main Draw

Ningbo Challenger - Doubles